Bheemavarm is a village in India. It is situated in Anakapalli district in the state of Andhra Pradesh.

Administration
The village is administrated by a Sarpanch who is an elected representative of village as per constitution of India and Panchayati raj (India).

Demography 
Bheemavarm village has 311 houses with a Population of 1,180 which consists of 593 males and 587 females.

References

Villages in Anakapalli district